Hesychotypa crocea is a species of beetle in the family Cerambycidae. It was described by Dillon and Dillon in 1945. It is known from French Guiana.

References

crocea
Beetles described in 1945